Revol, Révol, or de Revol is a French surname. Notable people with this surname include:
 (born 1973), French writer
Charles Revol-Tissot (1892–1971), French aviator
Élisabeth Revol (born 1979), French mountaineer
 (born 1978), French Catholic theologian
Gastón Revol (born 1986), Argentine rugby player
 (1912–1991), French sculptor
Louis de Revol (1531–1594), first French foreign minister
 (1858–1915), Argentine engineer and politician
 (1894–1967), French actor
Nathalie Revol (born 1967), French computer scientist
René Revol (born 1947), French politician